Tiruvalaputhur Manickavannar Temple is a Hindu temple located at Tiruvalaputhur in Mayiladuthurai district of Tamil Nadu, India.  The presiding deity is Shiva. He is called as Manicka Vannar and Rathna Pureeswarar. His consort is known as Brama Kunthalambica and Vandar Poonkuzhali.

Significance 
It is one of the shrines of the 275 Paadal Petra Sthalams - Shiva Sthalams glorified in the early medieval Tevaram poems by Tamil Saivite Nayanars Tirugnanasambandar and Sundarar.

Literary mention 
Tirugnanasambandar describes the feature of the deity as:

References

External links 
 
 

Shiva temples in Mayiladuthurai district
Padal Petra Stalam